People's Libraries Society (T.C.L.) was an educational society established in 1880 for the Prussian partition of Poland (active in the regions of Greater Poland or the Grand Duchy of Poznan, Pomerania, West Prussia, Kashubia and Silesia). Its main goal was to promote education in Polish among the people, especially the lower classes, and to revert the Germanisation practices of the Prussian authorities. The society established a network of libraries, reading rooms and organized speeches. It was active till the outbreak of World War II in 1939.

Famous members
Władysław Niegolewski (1819–1885) was a Polish liberal politician and member of parliament, insurgent in Greater Poland Uprising (1846), Greater Poland Uprising (1848) and January Uprising (1863), cofounder of the Central Economic Society (CTG) in 1861 and People's Libraries Society (TCL) in 1880.

Polish regional societies
Polish educational societies
1880s establishments in Poland
Prussian Partition